See is a municipality in the district of Landeck in the Austrian state of Tyrol located 8 km southwest of the city of Landeck. The village was founded in 1400 by farmers.  Nowadays, tourism is the main source of income.

References

External links

Cities and towns in Landeck District
Verwall Alps